The 67th Annual Primetime Creative Arts Emmy Awards ceremony was held on September 12, 2015, at the Microsoft Theater in Downtown Los Angeles. The event was broadcast in the U.S. by FXX on September 19, 2015. The ceremony was in conjunction with the annual Primetime Emmy Awards and is presented in recognition of creative, technical, visual, and other similar achievements in American television programming, including voice-over and guest acting roles.

For the first time, online voting was used to determine the winners. Online voting was also used to determine the nominees, which were announced on July 16, 2015. Juried award winners for animation, costumes for a variety series, motion design, and interactive awards were announced on September 10, 2015.

Winners and nominees
Winners are listed first and highlighted in bold:

Governor's Award
 A&E Networks

Programs

Acting

Animation

Casting

Choreography

Cinematography

Commercial

Costumes

Directing

Hairstyling

Hosting

Interactive Media

Lighting Design / Direction

Main Title Design

Make-up

Motion Design

Music

Picture Editing

Production Design

Sound

Special Visual Effects

Stunt Coordination

Technical Direction

Writing

Wins by network

Programs with multiple awards

References

External links
 67th Emmy Awards Nominees and Winners

067 Creative Arts
2015 in American television
2015 in Los Angeles
2015 television awards
2015 awards in the United States
September 2015 events in the United States